Dimension X is a first person action game for the Atari 8-bit family released in 1984 by Synapse Software. It was designed by Steve Hales, who previously wrote Slime and Fort Apocalypse for Synapse. Dimension X is a vehicle-based, first person shooter with similar gameplay to Atari's Battlezone and Novagen's Encounter (the latter of which was distributed in the US by Synapse). The manual includes instructions for a Commodore 64 version of the game, but it was never completed nor released.

The game was advertised far in advance of its release. Magazine ads emphasized features which did not exist or were not as impressive in the final game which contributed to a negative reception.

Gameplay

The game is played from a first person perspective, where the player sits inside the cockpit of a flying vehicle and fires missiles at "Regillian" enemies. Many elements of Dimension X have analogs in Star Raiders. The game world consists of a 5x5 grid of sectors which need to be cleared of Regillians. In Star Raiders the enemies attempt to surround and destroy sectors containing motherships; here the Regillians attempt to surround and destroy a sector containing the capitol. Various systems of the player's ship can be damaged by enemy fire, such as the scanner and map. Moving between sectors requires holding a crosshair steady in addition to moving over and under obstacles.

Development
Dimension X was advertised over nine months before being available, the ads featuring what appeared to be a texture-mapped ground plane using a technique promoted as "altered perspective scrolling." The printed ad also showed a 64 sector map on its own screen, which was not in the final game. In Halcyon Days: Interviews with Classic Computer and Video Game Programmers, designer Steve Hales said:

When the game was eventually released, it was met with generally poor reviews.

Reception
In a new product overview in ANALOG Computing, Lee H. Pappas wrote: "The only outstanding feature of the game is the scroll-in-any-direction moire pattern landscape." In the review in the same issue, Robert T. Martin found the game didn't live up to the developer's standards:
He also criticized the box art for showing features that don't exist in the game, such as tanks and spaceships.

The June 1984 issue of ROM magazine was more positive, giving the game an 8.8 out of 10. It was reviewed alongside Encounter, as the reviewer compared both games with Atari's Battlezone.

References

External links
Dimension X at Atari Mania

Synapse Software games
1984 video games
Atari 8-bit family games
Atari 8-bit family-only games
First-person shooters
Science fiction video games
Video games set on fictional planets
Video games developed in the United States